Tobi 16 - Coptic Calendar - Tobi 18

The seventeenth day of the Coptic month of Tobi, the fifth month of the Coptic year. On a common year, this day corresponds to January 12, of the Julian Calendar, and January 25, of the Gregorian Calendar. This day falls in the Coptic Season of Shemu, the season of the Harvest.

Commemorations

Saints 

 The departure of Saint Dometius, the brother of saint Maximus 
 The departure of Saint Yousab el-Abbah, Bishop of Girga

References 

Days of the Coptic calendar